The slowed rotor principle is used in the design of some helicopters. On a conventional helicopter the rotational speed of the rotor is constant; reducing it at lower flight speeds can reduce fuel consumption and enable the aircraft to fly more economically. In the compound helicopter and related aircraft configurations such as the gyrodyne and winged autogyro, reducing the rotational speed of the rotor and offloading part of its lift to a fixed wing reduces drag, enabling the aircraft to fly faster.

Introduction
Traditional helicopters get both their propulsion and lift from the main rotor; by using a dedicated propulsion device such as a propeller or jet engine, the rotor burden is lessened.
If wings are also used to lift the aircraft, the rotor can be unloaded (partially or fully) and its rotational speed further reduced, enabling higher aircraft speed. Compound helicopters use these methods, but the Boeing A160 Hummingbird shows that rotor-slowing is possible without wings or propellers, and regular helicopters may reduce turbine RPM (and thus rotor speed) to 85% using 19% less power. Alternatively, research suggests that twin-engine helicopters may decrease fuel consumption by 25%-40% when running only one engine, given adequate height and velocity well inside the safe areas of the height–velocity diagram.

As of 2012, no compound or hybrid wing/rotor (manned) aircraft had been produced in quantity, and only a few had been flown as experimental aircraft, mainly because the increased complexities have not been justified by military or civilian markets. Varying the rotor speed may induce severe vibrations at specific resonance frequencies.

Contra-rotating rotors (as on the Sikorsky X2) solve the problem of lift dissymmetry by having both left and right sides provide near equal lift with less flapping. The X2 deals with the compressibility issue by reducing its rotor speed from 446 to 360 RPM to keep the advancing blade tip below the sound barrier when going above 200 knots.

Design principles

Speed limits of aircraft rotors

The rotors of conventional helicopters are designed to operate at a fixed speed of rotation, to within a few percent. This introduces limitations in areas of the flight envelope where the optimal speed differs.

In particular, it limits the maximum forward speed of the aircraft. Two main issues restrict the speed of rotorcraft:

 Retreating blade stall. As forward speed of the helicopter increases, the airflow over the retreating blade becomes relatively slower, while the airflow over the advancing blade is relatively faster, creating more lift. If not counteracted by flapping, this would cause dissymmetry of lift and eventually retreating blade stall, and blade stability suffers as the blade reaches its limits for flapping.
 Transonic drag near the rotor blade tip. The faster-moving advancing blade tip may begin to approach the speed of sound, where transonic drag begins to rise steeply, and severe buffeting and vibration effects can occur. This effect prevents any further increase in speed, even if the helicopter has surplus power remaining, and even if it features a highly streamlined fuselage. A similar effect prevents propeller-driven aircraft from achieving supersonic speeds, although they can achieve higher speeds than a helicopter since the propeller blade isn't advancing in the direction of travel.

Slowed rotors and aircraft speed

For rotorcraft, advance ratio (or Mu, symbol ) is defined as the aircraft forward speed V divided by its relative blade tip speed. Upper mu limit is a critical design factor for rotorcraft, and the optimum for traditional helicopters is around 0.4.

The "relative blade tip speed" u is the tip speed relative to the aircraft (not the airspeed of the tip). Thus the formula for Advance ratio is
 
  where Omega (Ω) is the rotor's angular velocity, and R is the rotor radius (about the length of one rotor blade)

When the rotor blade is perpendicular to the aircraft and advancing, its tip airspeed Vt is the aircraft speed plus relative blade tip speed, or Vt=V+u. At mu=1, V is equal to u and the tip airspeed is twice the aircraft speed.

At the same position on the opposite side (retreating blade), the tip airspeed is the aircraft speed minus relative blade tip speed, or Vt=V-u. At mu=1, the tip airspeed is zero. At a mu between 0.7 and 1.0, most of the retreating side has reverse airflow.

Although rotor characteristics are fundamental to rotorcraft performance, little public analytical and experimental knowledge exists between advance ratios of 0.45 to 1.0, and none is known above 1.0 for full-size rotors. Computer simulations are not capable of adequate predictions at high mu. The region of reverse flow on the retreating blade is not well understood, however some research has been conducted, particularly for scaled rotors. The US Army Aviation Applied Technology Directorate runs a supporting program in 2016 aiming at developing transmissions with a 50% rotor speed reduction.

The profile drag of a rotor corresponds to the cube of its rotational speed.
Reducing the rotational speed is therefore a significant reduction of rotor drag, allowing higher aircraft speed A conventional rotor such as the UH-60A has lowest consumption around 75% rpm, but higher aircraft speed (and weight) requires higher rpm.

A rotor disk with variable radius is a different way of reducing tip speed to avoid compressibility, but blade loading theory suggests that a fixed radius with varying rpm performs better than a fixed rpm with varying radius.

Fuel economy of slowed rotors
Conventional helicopters have constant-speed rotors and adjust lift by varying the blade angle of attack or collective pitch. The rotors are optimised for high-lift or high-speed flight modes and in less demanding situations are not as efficient.

The profile drag of a rotor corresponds to the cube of its rotational speed.
Reducing the rotational speed and increasing the angle of attack can therefore give a significant reduction in rotor drag, allowing lower fuel consumption.

History

Technical parameters given for each type listed: 
maximum speed.
μ, the ratio of forward airspeed to rotational tip speed.
Rotor lift as a percentage of total lift, at full speed.
Lift-to-drag ratio (L/D).

Early development

When Juan de la Cierva developed the autogyro through the 1920s and 30s, it was found that the tip speeds of the advancing rotor blade could become excessive. Designers such as he and Harold F. Pitcairn developed the idea of adding a conventional wing to offload the rotor during high-speed flight, allowing it to rotate at slower speeds.

The Pitcairn PCA-2 of 1932 had a maximum speed of 20-, μ = 0.7, and L/D = 4.8

NACA engineer John Wheatley examined the effect of varying advance ratios up to about 0.7 in a wind tunnel in 1933 and published a landmark study in 1934. Although lift could be predicted with some accuracy, by 1939 the state of the art theory still gave unrealistically low values for rotor drag.

Postwar projects
Fairey Aviation in the UK developed a series of experimental tip-jet driven gyrodynes in the late 1940s and 1950s. They culminated in the Fairey Rotodyne, a VTOL passenger aircraft with a single main rotor supplemented by wings and twin turboprop engines. In forward flight the power to the rotor was reduced to about 10%. . 0.6. 120 to 140 60% \ 40%.

At the same time, the US Air Force was investigating fast VTOL aircraft. McDonnell developed what became the McDonnell XV-1, the first of the V-designated types, which flew in 1955. It was a tip-jet driven gyrodyne, which turned off rotor thrust at high airspeeds and relied on a pusher propeller to maintain forward flight and rotor autorotation. Lift was shared between the rotor and stub wings.

The Lockheed AH-56 Cheyenne arose out of Lockheed's ongoing research programme into rigid rotors, which began with the CL-475 in 1959. The Cheyenne flew just two years later, obtaining its forward thrust from a pusher propeller. However it did not enter production. . 0.8. .. \ 20%.

The Piasecki 16H Pathfinder project similarly evolved an initially conventional design into a compound helicopter through the 1960s, culminating in the 16H-1A Pathfinder II which flew successfully in 1965. Thrust was obtained via a ducted fan at the tail.

The Bell 533 of 1969 was a compound jet helicopter. .

Modern developments
The compound helicopter has continued to be studied and flown experimentally. In 2010 the Sikorsky X2 flew with coaxial rotors. . 0.8. 360 to 446. No wings. In 2013 the Eurocopter X3 flew. . 310 minus 15%. 40-80% \.

The compound autogyro, in which the rotor is supplemented by wings and thrust engine but is not itself powered, has also undergone further refinement by Jay Carter Jr. He flew his CarterCopter in 2005. . 1. 50%. By 2013 he had developed its design into a personal air vehicle, the Carter PAV. . 1.13. 105 to 350.

The potential of the slowed rotor in enhancing fuel economy has also been studied in the Boeing A160 Hummingbird UAV, a conventional helicopter. . 140 to 350.

See also
 Gyrodyne
 Convertiplane

References

Citations

Bibliography

 Berry, Ben & Chopra, Inderjit. Slowed Rotor Wind Tunnel Testing at UMD University of Maryland, 19 February 2014. Size: 3MB.   
 Bowen-Davies, Graham M. Performance and loads of variable tip speed rotorcraft at high advance ratios (dissertation) University of Maryland, 25 June 2015. Header. DOI:10.13016/M2N62C . Size: 313 pages in 7MB
 Datta, Anubhav et al. (2011). Experimental Investigation and Fundamental Understanding of a Slowed UH-60A Rotor at High Advance Ratios NASA ARC-E-DAA-TN3233, 2011. Header Accessed: April 2014. Size: 26 pages in 2MB
 DuBois, Cameron J. (2013). Flow Control on an Airfoil Under Reversed Flow Conditions Using Nanosecond Dielectric Barrier Discharge Actuators (dissertation abstract) Ohio State University. Accessed: 4 December 2014.  Size: 86 pages in 6MB
 Floros, Matthew W. & Wayne Johnson (2004). Stability Analysis of the Slowed-Rotor Compound Helicopter Configuration (1MB). Defense Technical Information Center, 2004. Alternate version, 8MB
 Gustafson, F. B. Effect on helicopter performance of modifications in profile-drag characteristics of rotor-blade airfoil sections  NACA, August 1944.
 Harris, Franklin D. (2003). An Overview of Autogyros and the McDonnell XV–1 Convertiplane NASA/CR—2003–212799, 2003. Header Mirror1, Mirror2. Size: 284 pages in 13MB
 Harris, Franklin D. (2008). Rotor Performance at High Advance Ratio: Theory versus Test NASA/CR—2008–215370, October 2008. Header Mirror. Accessed: 13 April 2014. Size: 521 pages in 5MB
 
 
 Khoshlahjeh, Maryam & Gandhi, Farhan (2013). Helicopter Rotor Performance Improvement with RPM Variation and Chord Extension Morphing American Helicopter Society. Accessed: 9 June 2014.
 Kottapalli, Sesi et al. (2012). Performance and loads correlation of a UH-60A slowed rotor at high advance ratios  NASA ARC-E-DAA-TN4610, June 2012. Header  Size: 30 pages in 2MB
 Landis, Tony and Jenkins, Dennis R. Lockheed AH-56A Cheyenne – WarbirdTech Volume 27, Specialty Press, 2000. .
 Munson, Kenneth (1973); Helicopters: And Other Rotorcraft Since 1907, London, Blandford, Revised edition 1973.
 Rigsby, James Michael (2008). Stability and control issues associated with lightly loaded rotors autorotating in high advance ratio flight (dissertation abstract) Georgia Institute of Technology, December 2008.  Size: 166 pages in 3MB
 Robb, Raymond L. (2006). Hybrid helicopters: Compounding the quest for speed, Vertiflite. Summer 2006. American Helicopter Society.  Size: 25 pages in 2MB
 Seddon, John M. (& Simon Newman). Basic Helicopter Aerodynamics  John Wiley and Sons, 2011. 
 Silva, Christopher ; Yeo, Hyeonsoo ; Johnson, Wayne. (2010) Design of a Slowed-Rotor Compound Helicopter for Future Joint Service Missions NASA ADA529322. Mirror Size: 17 pages in 4MB
 D. Walsh, S. Weiner, K. Arifian, T. Lawrence, M. Wilson, T. Millott and R. Blackwell. High Airspeed Testing of the Sikorsky X2 Technology Demonstrator Sikorsky, May 4, 2011. Accessed: October 5, 2013. Size: 12 pages in 3MB

External links

 
Aerospace engineering
Helicopter aerodynamics
Rotorcraft